The Utah Valley Symphony is an American orchestra based in Provo, Utah. 

The orchestra was organized in 1959 with about 30 members and an initial audience of eleven people. Today, it has grown to over 75 members and gives multiple performances to accommodate demand. The orchestra performs 6 concerts a season at the Covey Center for the Arts in Provo, Utah.

External links
 The Official Site of the Utah Valley Symphony
 Covey Center for the Arts

Musical groups established in 1959
American orchestras
Musical groups from Utah
1959 establishments in Utah
Performing arts in Utah